Harold Geovanny Fonseca Baca (born 8 October 1993) is a Honduran professional footballer who plays as a goalkeeper for Olancho FC and the Honduras national team.

External links
 

1993 births
Living people
Sportspeople from Tegucigalpa
Honduran footballers
Association football goalkeepers
F.C. Motagua players
Juticalpa F.C. players
C.D.S. Vida players
C.D. Olimpia players
Liga Nacional de Fútbol Profesional de Honduras players
Honduras international footballers
Footballers at the 2016 Summer Olympics
Olympic footballers of Honduras